Marco Mannhardt (born 4 July 2002) is a German professional footballer who plays as a defensive midfielder for FV Illertissen.

Career

1860 Munich
Mannhardt began his youth career with Wacker Burghausen and Bayern Munich, before joining the academy of 1860 Munich in December 2017. He signed his first professional contract with 1860 Munich in November 2020. On 26 February 2021, he made his professional debut for the club in the 3. Liga, coming on as a substitute in the second minute of second-half stoppage time for Sascha Mölders against SpVgg Unterhaching. The home match finished as a 3–1 win for 1860 Munich. After making his first appearance of the 2021–22 season in a 3–0 defeat to Waldhof Mannheim in March 2022, Mannhardt suffered a foot injury that ruled him out for several months.

FV Illertissen
On 1 January 2023, it was announced that Mannhardt had signed for Regionalliga Bayern club FV Illertissen.

References

External links
 
 
 
 

2002 births
Living people
People from Traunstein (district)
Sportspeople from Upper Bavaria
Footballers from Bavaria
German footballers
Association football midfielders
TSV 1860 Munich players
TSV 1860 Munich II players
FV Illertissen players
3. Liga players
Bayernliga players